Akron Roller Derby is a women's flat track roller derby league based in Akron, Ohio. Two separate Akron-based leagues, NEO Roller Derby and Rubber City Rollergirls, merged in November 2016 to become Akron Roller Derby. The league consists of two teams which compete against teams from other leagues, and is a member of the Women's Flat Track Derby Association (WFTDA).

History

Akron's original roller derby league was founded in June 2006 by Mary Elliott. The Rubber City Demolition Dolls were featured in the Akron Beacon Journal on May 27, 2007. Shortly after, Elliott bowed out but the original league stayed intact. Elliott kept rights to the Rubber City name for derby use. 
NEO Roller Derby was founded as the Northeast Ohio Rock 'n' Roller Girls a group of eleven women from RCDD. The Rock 'n' Roller Girls name was later reserved for the league's A team. The league attracted attention for raising money for charities including Stewart's Caring Place and the American Red Cross.

Meanwhile, Rubber City Rollergirls was founded in Akron in 2008 after receiving permission from Elliott to use the reformed name, and played its first bout, at the John S. Knight Center, in April 2009.  The league was accepted into the Women's Flat Track Derby Association Apprentice Program in January 2010, and instituted its B team later in the year. By 2011, it had forty skaters, and was claiming crowds of 1,000 fans. Its A team was known as the Tire Iron Maidens, and its B team was the Hot Rod Dollies. Rubber City at some point left the Apprentice program, and was not listed as such in February 2013. In October 2014, Rubber City re-entered the Apprentice Program.

In November 2016, NEO Roller Derby and Rubber City Rollergirls announced on their social media pages, in a statement confirmed by a new, mutual website, that the leagues had merged to become Akron Roller Derby.

WFTDA
NEO was accepted into the Women's Flat Track Derby Association Apprentice Program in September 2009, and became a full member of the WFTDA in September 2010.  By 2011, the league had almost forty skaters, and was attracting crowds averaging 600 people.

In 2013, NEO qualified for the WFTDA Division 2 International Playoffs for the first time, competing at the tournament held in Kalamazoo, Michigan that August. NEO finished the tournament in 4th place, losing the 3rd place game to host team, the Kalamazoo Derby Darlins, 250-219.

WFTDA rankings

As Neo Roller Derby

As Akron Roller Derby

References

Sports in Akron, Ohio
Roller derby leagues in Ohio
2016 establishments in Ohio
Sports clubs established in 2016